Puls stylised as PULS are a Danish musical band specializing in pop, dance and club music made up of Micky (full name Micky Skeel Hansen) and Niel (full name Niels Kristian Baarsby) and are signed to PhatPhase label.

Micky (born 23 December 1988 in Køge) and Neil (born in Høje Taastrup) met through online music network www.mymusic.dk where they had posted their own materials. Mickey Skeel Hansen was already an active Danish actor who had appeared on Snurre Snups Søndagsklub on Danish TV 2 channel in 2005. He had also appeared in a number of films including Familien Gregersen, Af banen and Dommeren (in 2004–2005), in TV series Sommer in 2008 and in Remix, a film about  music industry's relationship to child stars.

Mickey and Neil invested in studio equipment, and loaded more than 80 songs. The first commercial release was "Superstar", produced by Jacob "J.R." Simonsen also known as Lil'Jay of Apollon accompanied by a music video of the song by Blue Sky Music. It did quite well in dancing circuits with Simonsen becoming PULS' producer.

PULS had their official debut single in the Danish Singles Chart with "Lad det slå". Soon after, an English-language version called "Let It Go" was released for international use in night clubs. PULS'  biggest hit has been the single "Dope" featuring known  cosmetician and reality show personality Ole Henriksen, reaching #3 on the Danish Charts.

Discography

Albums

EPs

Singles

Other singles releases 
2011: "Let It Go" (English version of "Lad det slå")

Featured in
2010: "Club Certified" [Kylan Mash feat. Akon, Glasses & PULS]
2011: "Kom tilbage nu" (Haider feat. PULS)

References

External links
PULS Official website
PULS Facebook
Blue Sky Music Official website
Blue Sky Music MySpace
Lili'Jay (Jacob "J.R." Simonsen) MySpace

Danish musical groups
Danish musical duos
People from Høje-Taastrup Municipality